Homersfield was a railway station which served the village of Homersfield in Suffolk, England, although the station was located in Alburgh, across the county boundary in Norfolk. The station was part of the Waveney Valley Line.

References

External links
 Homersfield station on 1946 O. S. map
 Dove restaurant adjacent to Homersfield station

Disused railway stations in Norfolk
Former Great Eastern Railway stations
Railway stations in Great Britain opened in 1860
Railway stations in Great Britain closed in 1953
Waveney District